USS Doris B. III (SP-733) was a United States Navy patrol vessel in commission from 1917 to 1918.

Doris B. III was built as a private motorboat of the same name by Britt Brothers at Lynn, Massachusetts, in 1912. In June 1917, the U.S. Navy acquired her under a free lease from her owner, J. R. Jewett of Cambridge, Massachusetts, for use as a section patrol boat during World War I. She was commissioned as USS Doris B. III (SP-733) on 25 June 1917.

Assigned to the 2nd Naval District in southern New England, Doris B. III performed patrol duty for the rest of World War I.

Doris B. III was decommissioned after the end of the war and returned to Jewett on 3 December 1918.

References

Department of the Navy Naval History and Heritage Command Online Library of Selected Images: Civilian Ships: Doris B. III (American Motor Boat, 1912). Served as USS Doris B. III (SP-733) and in 1917-1918
NavSource Online: Section Patrol Craft Photo Archive Doris B. III (SP 733)

Patrol vessels of the United States Navy
World War I patrol vessels of the United States
Ships built in Lynn, Massachusetts
1912 ships